Alessandro Catalani (18 April 1905 – 6 August 1986) was an Italian racing cyclist. He rode in the 1931 Tour de France.

References

External links
 

1905 births
1986 deaths
Italian male cyclists
Place of birth missing
Cyclists from the Province of Pavia